Lars Pensjö of Sweden is the original author of the LPMud MUD engine and the LPC programming language, and is one of the founders of Genesis LPMud, notable for their part in the history of MMORPGs as well as the Pike programming language.  He attended Chalmers University of Technology in Gothenburg, Sweden, from 1980 to 1984. He was a member of the as of 2008 defunct
Chalmers Datorförening ("CD"), after which the CD gamedriver and mudlib were named.

Pensjö works for the software company Ghost Games.
He lives in Torslanda, Gothenburg, together with his wife Marica Pensjö, a certified masseuse.  They have three sons, Mikael, Jonas and Andreas.

Pensjö's hobbies include running for the team Solvikingarna in Skatås, Gothenburg.

References

Swedish computer programmers
MUD developers
Chalmers University of Technology alumni
Living people
Year of birth missing (living people)